New Trzepowo  is a village in the administrative district of Gmina Stara Biała, within Płock County, Masovian Voivodeship, in east-central Poland.

New Trzepowo is Located at  52°35'33"N 19°44'20"E.

In the years 1975–1998, the town was administratively part of the Plock province. The population at the 2011 census was 377.

References

New Trzepowo